William Reginald Duncombe, Viscount  Helmsley (1 August 1852 – 24 December 1881), was a British Conservative Party politician.

Helmsley was the son of William Duncombe, 1st Earl of Feversham, and his wife Mabel Violet (née Graham), daughter of Sir James Graham, 2nd Baronet. He was elected to the House of Commons as one of two representatives for the North Riding of Yorkshire in the 1874 general election, a seat he held until his death seven years later.

Lord Helmsley married the seventeen-year-old Lady Muriel Frances Louisa, daughter of Charles Chetwynd-Talbot, 19th Earl of Shrewsbury, in 1876. They had one son and one daughter. Lady Helmsley was active in the Garden City movement.  
Lady Mabel Theresa Duncombe (1877–1913), who married Sir Gervase Beckett, 1st Baronet, as his first wife in 1895. He later remarried her sister-in-law Lady Feversham in 1917).
Charles William Reginald Duncombe, 2nd Earl of Feversham (1879–1916)

He died in December 1881, at Madeira, aged only 29. His son Charles later succeeded in the earldom. Lady Helmsley later remarried in 1885, and died in March 1925.

Notes

References 
Kidd, Charles, Williamson, David (editors). Debrett's Peerage and Baronetage (1990 edition). New York: St Martin's Press, 1990, 

Annual Register 1881

External links 
 

1852 births
1881 deaths
Conservative Party (UK) MPs for English constituencies
UK MPs 1874–1880
UK MPs 1880–1885
Heirs apparent who never acceded
British courtesy viscounts
William